Jacques Ledoux (1921 in Warsaw – 6 June 1988 in Brussels) was a Belgian cinema specialist, the first curator of the Royal Film Archive of Belgium (Cinémathèque royale de Belgique) from 1948 to 1988 and the founder of the Cinema Museum in Brussels (Musée du cinéma de Bruxelles) in 1962.

Awards and honors 
Ledoux received the Erasmus Prize, a Dutch award for contributions to art in 1988.

References

External links
 "Cinémathèque, son doux souci" (interview), Cinergie, vol. 0, 1993. 

1921 births
1988 deaths
Film curators
Belgian archivists
Polish emigrants to Belgium